Bayfront Center was an indoor arena located in St. Petersburg, Florida that hosted many concerts, sporting and other events. Depending on the configuration, it could hold up to 8,600 people. The arena was opened in 1965 and demolished in 2004. It adjoined the Mahaffey Theater, which is still standing.

Musical acts
Over its 40-year history, a wide variety of top entertainers performed at the Bayfront Center including: Elvis Presley, Metallica, Lynyrd Skynyrd, B.B. King, Van Halen, Bruce Springsteen, Frank Sinatra, Aerosmith, the Beach Boys, James Brown, the Grateful Dead, Elton John, RUSH, The Police, Johnny Cash, the Beastie Boys,  Liberace, Bon Jovi, Jimmy Buffett, Ray Charles, Bob Dylan, KISS, and The Who.

Sports

Basketball
The venue hosted the American Basketball Association's The Floridians when the team played in St. Petersburg during the 1970–71 and 1971–72 seasons.

The South Florida Bulls men's basketball team used the Bayfront Center for some home games between 1974-1980.

The Tampa Bay Thrillers of the Continental Basketball Association played two non-consecutive seasons (1984–85 and 1986–87) in the arena, winning the CBA title in 1985. Because of an apparent rent/lease dispute they moved to Tampa the following year and won another title. With a new owner at the helm they returned to the Bayfront Center for their third season. Attendance sagged to as few as 295 fans, so the franchise relocated to Rapid City, South Dakota at the end of that regular season, and won that year's CBA title for an unusual three-peat.
The arena served as the home arena of the Tampa Bay ThunderDawgs of the ABA for the 2000-2001 season.

Ice hockey
The Bayfront Center was home ice for the St. Petersburg Suns of the Eastern Hockey League from 1971 to 1973, and then for the Suncoast Suns of the Southern Hockey League for the 1973–74 season.

Indoor soccer
The Tampa Bay Rowdies of the North American Soccer League played nearly all of their indoor home games at the Bayfront Center throughout their NASL existence, winning titles in 1976, 1979–80 and 1983. The Rowdies later joined American Indoor Soccer Association and again used the arena for the AISA 1986–87 season.

The Tampa Bay Terror of the National Professional Soccer League also used the venue in the 1995–96 and 1996–97 seasons.

Other events
From the 1960s to the 1990s, the Bayfront Center was the location for Ringling Brothers & Barnum and Bailey's annual spring TV taping. Until 1992, every spring Ringling Brothers taped a network TV special from the arena and also shot all the photos for their programs there.

The Pinellas County Industrial and Aerospace Exhibition, featuring several of NASA's Apollo program displays, was held at the venue from 1968 to 1971.

The arena also hosted many professional wrestling events, among them the WCW's SuperBrawl I and VI, and Slamboree (1995).
Other groups, such as Jehovah's Witnesses, held annual conventions featuring Bible discourses, which were free of charge.

Demise
The Bayfront Center was finally imploded in 2004 to make way for an eventual replacement facility for the nearby Salvador Dalí Museum.

References

1965 establishments in Florida
2004 disestablishments in Florida
American Basketball Association venues
Continental Basketball Association venues
Sports venues demolished in 2004
Defunct basketball venues in the United States
Defunct indoor arenas in Florida
Defunct indoor ice hockey venues in the United States
Defunct indoor soccer venues in the United States
Indoor ice hockey venues in Florida
Miami Floridians
Music venues in Florida
Sports venues completed in 1965
Sports venues in St. Petersburg, Florida
Tampa Bay Rowdies sports facilities
North American Soccer League (1968–1984) indoor venues
Defunct sports venues in Florida
Demolished sports venues in Florida
Former South Florida Bulls sports venues